Garczegorze  is a village in the administrative district of Gmina Nowa Wieś Lęborska, within Lębork County, Pomeranian Voivodeship, in northern Poland.

For details of the history of the region, see History of Pomerania.

The village has a population of 364.

References

See also
 A Roman Catholic Church, the Parish church st. Mary Magdalene, 1897, registration number: A-1720 of December 13, 2000

Garczegorze